The women's combined event at the 2018 Asian Games took place from 23 August to 26 August 2018  at Jakabaring Sport City, Palembang, Indonesia.

Schedule
All times are Western Indonesia Time (UTC+07:00)

Results 
Legend
DNS — Did not start
FS — False start

Qualification

Speed

Bouldering

Lead

Summary

Final

Speed

Quarterfinals

Semifinals

Finals

Bouldering

Lead

Summary

References

External links
Official website

Sport climbing at the 2018 Asian Games